Sheldon Lettich (born January 14, 1951) is an American screenwriter, film director and producer. He is best known for his collaborations with Jean-Claude Van Damme and his work in the action film genre.

Early life
He was born in New York City, but moved to California at a young age and grew up in the Los Angeles area.  After graduation from high school he spent nearly four years in the U.S. Marine Corps, serving as a radio operator in South Vietnam with 3rd Battalion, 1st Marines, and later with the elite 1st Force Reconnaissance Company based at Camp Pendleton, California.

He worked his way through college as a professional photographer, and attended the AFI Conservatory's Center for Advanced Film Studies as a Cinematography Fellow.  Although his initial career goal was to become a director of photography, at the AFI his interests branched out to encompass writing and directing, which became the two fields where he found eventual success in the entertainment business.

Writing for the stage
Based partly upon his experiences in Vietnam, he co-authored the renowned play Tracers with a group of Vietnam vets who were also aspiring actors.  First performed July 4, 1980 at the Odyssey Theater in Los Angeles, the play then traveled to Joseph Papp's Public Theater in New York City, the Steppenwolf Theater in Chicago (directed by Gary Sinise), the Royal Court Theater in London, and numerous venues worldwide.  It received both Drama Desk Awards and L.A. Drama Critics Awards, and is still being performed throughout the world.

Screenplays
Around the same time, Lettich was writing numerous spec screenplays. One of these, co-written with Josh Becker, subsequently became the cult classic Thou Shalt Not Kill... Except (also known as Stryker's War), which starred Bruce Campbell, and directed by Becker, both frequent collaborators of Sam Raimi.

Eventually his screenplays began attracting the attention of producers in Hollywood. He co-authored the Cold War drama Russkies, which was the first starring role for a young Joaquin Phoenix. Around the same time he wrote the screenplay for the now-classic martial arts film Bloodsport, which launched the career of Jean-Claude Van Damme. One of his Vietnam-based screenplays caught the eye of Sylvester Stallone, which resulted in an overall deal with Stallone's White Eagle Productions, and led to him co-writing Rambo III with Stallone.

The success of Bloodsport not only turned Jean-Claude Van Damme into an international action star, but it also forged a long and ongoing friendship with the man who wrote it. Van Damme helped to launch Lettich's directing career with the film Lionheart, which became Van Damme's first movie to be released theatrically by a major U.S. studio. This was followed by Double Impact, which was filmed in Hong Kong, with Lettich directing Van Damme in a challenging double role as twin brothers seeking revenge for their parents' murder.

Lettich next discovered Mark Dacascos, who made his starring debut in Only the Strong, a film that introduced the Brazilian martial art of capoeira to international audiences. He also directed Dolph Lundgren in The Last Patrol and Daniel Bernhardt in Perfect Target.

Continuing his long association with Van Damme, Lettich was a writer and a producer on the historical French Foreign Legion film, Legionnaire, which was filmed on location in Morocco. And he directed The Order, an action-thriller starring Van Damme and Charlton Heston, which was filmed on locations in Israel and Bulgaria.

In 2006 he directed and co-wrote The Hard Corps, an urban action-romance. Starring Jean-Claude Van Damme and Vivica Fox, the film was shot on locations around Vancouver, British Columbia, Canada, and on sound stages in Romania, and was financed and released worldwide by Sony Pictures Entertainment.

Lettich stated he has always wanted to make a Vietnam War movie that he wrote, but after seeing Tropic Thunder he felt that no one would take a Vietnam war movie seriously anymore.

Filmography

References

External links
 Official website
 Sheldon Lettich's posts on VanDammeFan.net
 

1951 births
Film producers from New York (state)
Living people
American male screenwriters
Place of birth missing (living people)
Writers from New York City
AFI Conservatory alumni
Film directors from New York City
Screenwriters from New York (state)